Zebrzydowa  is a village in the administrative district of Gmina Nowogrodziec, within Bolesławiec County, Lower Silesian Voivodeship, in south-western Poland.

Notable residents
 Oskar Freiherr von Boenigk (1893–1946), Luftwaffe general

References

Zebrzydowa